Padres FC was an Australian soccer club from Darwin, Northern Territory, Australia.

Colours 
Padres FC's kit colours are yellow with black shoulder streaks and black shorts.

References

External links 
 Padres FC FFNT Official Webpage

Soccer clubs in the Northern Territory

Defunct soccer clubs in Australia